Kiyomoto is both a Japanese surname and a masculine Japanese given name. Notable people with the name include:

Surname:
, Japanese footballer

Given name:
, Japanese kabuki actor

See also
25075 Kiyomoto, main-belt minor planet
Kiyomoto (music), a genre of traditional Japanese music

Japanese-language surnames
Japanese masculine given names